Christopher Brewin was a British academic and expert on Cyprus. He was a Senior Lecturer in International Relations at Keele University, Staffordshire, England from 1972 until his retirement in 2008. He died in July 2018.

Education 
Brewin was educated at the University of Grenoble, Études Françaises, the University of Oxford (where he held an Open Exhibition in English at St John's College and an Open Scholarship in Modern History at Christ Church), and at Harvard University (where he was awarded a Fulbright Scholarship, Frank Knox Memorial Fellowship, and Sinclair Kennedy Fellowship, as well as the Keith Feiling History Prize).

Memberships 
Chris Brewin was a member of the Royal Institute of International Affairs, Chatham House, the British International Studies Association, the University Association for Contemporary European Studies, the Turkish Area Study Group, and the Association for Greek, Turkish and Cypriot Affairs. He contributed to many International Relations journals and was a member of Review of International Law and Politics International Advisory Board.

References

Bibliography 
(2000) The European Union and Cyprus Huntingdon: Eothen (hardcover, ; paperback)
(2002) Turkey and Europe after the Nice Summit TESEV Publications

External links 
 Keele University – Forum for Ethnicity, Migration & Marginalisation

1945 births
2018 deaths
Academics from London
Academics of Keele University
Alumni of Christ Church, Oxford
Alumni of St John's College, Oxford
Harvard University alumni
Grenoble Alpes University alumni
Chatham House people